Rugby sevens at the 2018 Asian Games was held over three days from 30 August to 1 September 2018. This was the sixth appearance of rugby sevens at the Asian Games. The Games was planned to be held at the Wibawa Mukti Stadium in Bekasi but then moved to Rugby Field inside the Gelora Bung Karno Sports Complex.

Schedule

Medalists

Medal table

Draw
The draw for the competition was done at the JS Luwansa Hotel, Jakarta on 5 July 2018. The draw was conducted by Indonesian Asian Games Organizing Committee (INASGOC) in the presence of general manager Asia Rugby.

Men

Group A

Group B

Group C

Women

Group A

Group B

Final standing

Men

Women

References

External links
Official website
Asia rugby
Official Result Book – Rugby Sevens

 
rugby sevens
2018
2018 rugby sevens competitions
2018 in Asian rugby union